Healthy Choice is the name of a brand of refrigerated and frozen foods owned by ConAgra Foods. According to ConAgra's official corporate history, it came into being after then-ConAgra CEO Charles "Mike" Harper suffered a heart attack in 1985. Forced to dramatically alter his diet, he came up with the idea of a line of healthier frozen foods.

ConAgra sells a broad array of dishes through its Healthy Choice brand, including frozen dinners, side dishes, cold cuts and other meats, canned soups, ice cream, bread, pasta sauce, and even popcorn.

In April 2009, ConAgra reintroduced Healthy Choice's line of frozen meals along with new products, including a line of All Natural Entrees. To promote the changes, Healthy Choice spent between $900 million and $1.5 billion on a multimedia campaign that includes advertisements with actress Julia Louis-Dreyfus featured in commercials directed by Christopher Guest. Other rebranding efforts included new packaging designs.

In Canada, Healthy Choice is a brand of ConAgra Brands. In Australia, McCain Foods, a Canadian company, owns the Healthy Choice name.

See also

 David Phillips - who won a large amount of frequent flyer points in a Healthy Choice promotion. A subplot in the film Punch-Drunk Love is based on Phillips.
 List of popcorn brands

References

External links

 Healthy Choice - brand

Popcorn brands
Ice cream brands
Frozen food brands
Conagra Brands brands
Brand name diet products